Penicillium isariiforme is an anamorph, phototropic species of the genus of Penicillium which produce secalonic acid D and F.

References

Further reading
 
 
 
 
 
 
 

isariiforme
Fungi described in 1957